Pterolophia castaneivora is a species of beetle in the family Cerambycidae. It was described by Ohbayashi and Masao Hayashi in 1962. It is known from South Korea and Japan.

References

castaneivora
Beetles described in 1962